Mount Cowen is in the Absaroka Range in the U.S. state of Montana. The peak is located in Gallatin National Forest. Several small glacierets exist on the flanks of the peak, especially on the northern slopes.

References

Mountains of Park County, Montana
Mountains of Montana